Edinboro is a borough in Erie County, Pennsylvania, United States. It is part of the Erie Metropolitan Statistical Area. As home to Edinboro University of Pennsylvania, it is a small college town, as well as a resort community. The population was 4,920 at the 2020 census, down from 6,438 in 2010.

The town is located in the snowbelt region south of Lake Erie.

History
Members of the Eriez, Iroquois, and Cornplanter Native tribes were the first known residents of the area that is now known as Edinboro. The tribes called the region Conneauttee, meaning "land of the living snowflake". William Culbertson moved to the area in 1801, building a gristmill near Conneauttee Lake.

From 1801 to 1825, the roots of the town were formed when congregations of Presbyterian and Methodist churches began moving to the area and building houses and churches, some of which are still around today. The original resident, William Culbertson, built the first school around 1825. The first post office was built and formed around 1837 when it was included in the Erie and Crawford counties' postal routes. A turnpike between Erie and Meadville was constructed in the 1840s; it was made of wooden planks, and completed in 1852. In 1857, an academy was started, which was renamed the State Normal School in 1861, and which would eventually become Edinboro University of Pennsylvania.

A trolley station was built by the railway company.  That company built an electric railway in the 1900s which drew more traffic to the area. Fires in 1902, 1905, and 1909, destroyed most of the wood-framed, commercial buildings, many of which were replaced with brick structures that are still standing today. Many more houses, condominiums, and apartments were constructed from 1910 through the 1950s, as Edinboro promoted itself, mainly to the surrounding populations in Pittsburgh and Erie as a resort area by the lake.  This promotion which boosted tourism, while the college gained enrollment and drew more residents to the town.

The 1960s was a significant growth period for the town, as around 400 building permits were issued for both housing and business. A post office was built in 1960, and evolved to first class status by 1966. The demand for water consumption had tripled throughout this period, and prompted the construction of a new sewage plant in 1970.

The borough's home rule charter was adopted in 1974, with a new municipal building being constructed in 1975. In 1980, the census placed Edinboro first in population growth in Erie County, with a population increase of 30% from 1970 to 1980 to a total of 6,324. The businesses in the borough continued to grow, and in 1983, Edinboro State College received accreditation by the state and was renamed Edinboro University of Pennsylvania. Between the 1980s and 2000s, Edinboro University has grown to be northwestern Pennsylvania's largest university and is a key factor in drawing people to the area. Today, Edinboro is known as a college town in the winter and lake resort during the summer.

Academy Hall was listed on the National Register of Historic Places in 2006.

Geography
Edinboro is located in southern Erie County at  (41.876558, -80.131661). It is surrounded by Washington Township.

The center of the borough is at the south end of Edinboro Lake and around its outlet, Conneauttee Creek, a south-flowing tributary of French Creek and part of the Allegheny River/Ohio River/Mississippi River watershed. Darrows Creek, a tributary of Conneauttee Creek, rises east of town and flows south through the campus of the Edinboro University of Pennsylvania.

U.S. Route 6N passes through the center of Edinboro, leading east  to U.S. Routes 6 and 19 near Mill Village, and west  to Interstate 79. Pennsylvania Route 99 crosses US 6N in the center of Edinboro, leading north  to McKean and southeast  to Cambridge Springs.

Demographics

As of the census of 2000, there were 6,950 people, 2,087 households, and 830 families residing in the borough. The population density was 3,000.6 people per square mile (1,156.6/km2). There were 2,242 housing units at an average density of 968.0 per square mile (373.1/km2). The racial makeup of the borough was 92.29% White, 4.45% African American, 0.16% Native American, 1.61% Asian, 0.03% Pacific Islander, 0.52% from other races, and 0.95% from two or more races. Hispanic or Latino of any race were 0.99% of the population.

There were 2,087 households, out of which 19.3% had children under the age of 18 living with them, 29.9% were married couples living together, 8.3% had a female householder with no husband present, and 60.2% were non-families. 29.9% of all households were made up of individuals, and 5.7% had someone living alone who was 65 years of age or older. The average household size was 2.37 and the average family size was 2.93.

In the borough the population was spread out, with 10.8% under the age of 18, 56.6% from 18 to 24, 15.0% from 25 to 44, 10.7% from 45 to 64, and 6.8% who were 65 years of age or older. The median age was 22 years. For every 100 females age 18 and over, there were 84.4 males.

The median income for a household in the borough was $26,652, and the median income for a family was $48,516. Males had a median income of $33,750 versus $24,821 for females. The per capita income for the borough was $12,209. About 11.0% of families and 34.4% of the population were below the poverty line, including 10.8% of those under age 18 and 2.5% of those age 65 or over.

Education
With an enrollment over 8,700, Edinboro University of Pennsylvania, a member of the Pennsylvania State System of Higher Education, is a major contributor to the local economy.  Edinboro University was founded in 1857.

Notable people 
Bruce Baumgartner, 1984 Olympic gold medalist in freestyle wrestling 
Clarence B. Culbertson, former Wisconsin state legislator
William Constantine Culbertson, former U.S. Congressman
John R. Evans, former Pennsylvania State Representative
John Randolph Lewis, former Freedmen's Bureau administrator
Allison McAtee, actress
Scott Douglas Miller, Virginia Wesleyan University president
Blidi Wreh-Wilson, former professional football player, Tampa Bay Buccaneers
David F. Winder, Vietnam War Medal of Honor recipient
Ali Zaidi, first White House National Climate Advisor

References

External links

Populated places established in 1801
Boroughs in Erie County, Pennsylvania
1840 establishments in Pennsylvania